Ken Klippenstein (born February 1, 1988) is an American journalist working at The Intercept. Prior to joining The Intercept, Klippenstein was the D.C. Correspondent at The Nation and previously a senior investigative reporter for the online news program The Young Turks. His work has also appeared in The Daily Beast, Salon, and other publications. His reporting focuses on U.S. federal and national security matters as well as corporate controversies.

Education
Klippenstein graduated from Wheaton College in 2010 with a Bachelor of Arts degree in English literature.

Career 
Klippenstein's early journalism career began in Madison, Wisconsin. His work with The Young Turks started as early as 2018. In 2020, Klippenstein joined The Nation as their D.C. correspondent.

Use of the Freedom of Information Act 
Klippenstein is a self-described "FOIA nerd"; much of his journalism draws on information he has uncovered from records requested at state and national levels of the US government. He invites individuals to leak information to him via the encrypted messaging service Signal.

His articles also frequently include information from leaked documents. He obtained leaked documents from the PR firm Qorvis, which implicated the company pitching the private company Caliburn on a propaganda video in order to improve the reputation of Caliburn's Homestead, a Florida shelter for "unaccompanied alien children". In an April 2020 article, Klippenstein reported on a leaked document showing that the Pentagon had warned the White House in 2017 about the risk of shortages and ill-preparation for a pandemic brought on by a novel coronavirus such as SARS-CoV-2. Klippenstein, along with Talia Lavin and Noelle Llamas, successfully sued the U.S. Immigration and Customs Enforcement. In December, 2020, he filed two new FOIA lawsuits: one against the U.S. Department of Justice and the other against U.S. Immigration and Customs Enforcement, U.S. Customs and Border Protection, U.S. Department of State, Federal Bureau of Investigation, Defense Intelligence Agency, Office of Intelligence and Analysis, U.S. Department of Energy, Cybersecurity and Infrastructure Security Agency.

During the George Floyd protests, Klippenstein's reporting uncovered documents regarding federal policing of the protests. Specifically, Klippenstein obtained an FBI document that stated the Washington Field Office "has no intelligence indicating Antifa involvement/presence" during DC-area protests in contradiction to Attorney General William Barr and other officials' assertions that Antifa were specifically responsible for instigating violence. He also reported that contacts working at the Department of Homeland Security were disgruntled about orders to generate internal intelligence reports on journalists covering protests in Portland, Oregon as well as participating activists.

Later, he co-authored with Lee Fang an article published by The Intercept in October 2022 regarding leaked documents exposing Department of Homeland Security's plans to secretly police disinformation online. In response, Klippenstein was interviewed on Useful Idiots, where he expressed concern about what he saw as a major media failure regarding intelligence information oversight in a situation with no one in control as things drift toward disaster.

Internet pranks 
Klippenstein has occasionally been the subject of reporting as well due to him pranking individuals from across the political spectrum. Following a Twitter flame war with Tesla CEO Elon Musk, he attracted Musk's attention by sharing a Vogue photograph from the 2014 Vanity Fair Oscars afterparty showing Musk with Ghislaine Maxwell, a long-time associate of the late convicted sex offender Jeffrey Epstein, who has been convicted of sex trafficking. Musk, who as of June 3, 2020, had 35.5 million Twitter followers, publicly posted that Klippenstein was a "douche-about-town."

In July 2019, Klippenstein was covered in the media after a Twitter incident in which he was retweeted by Iowa Congressman Steve King just before changing his Twitter display name to "Steve King is a white supremacist." In March 2021, Klippenstein pranked author Naomi Wolf by recommending she tweet an image of a fabricated anti-vaxxer quotation paired with a picture of American pornography actor Johnny Sins.

On Memorial Day 2021, Klippenstein tricked political commentators Dinesh D'Souza and Matt Schlapp as well as Florida Congressman Matt Gaetz into retweeting a photograph of Lee Harvey Oswald, John F. Kennedy's assassin, whom Klippenstein claimed was his veteran grandfather. After being retweeted by Gaetz, Klippenstein changed his display name on Twitter to be "matt gaetz is a pedo". Gaetz later deleted his retweet.

References

External links 

 Ken Klippenstein on Twitter

1988 births
Living people
21st-century American journalists
American male journalists
American online journalists
American political journalists
Salon (website) people
The Nation (U.S. magazine) people
The Young Turks people
Wheaton College (Illinois) alumni